Mollen is a surname. Notable people with the surname include:

 André Mollen, Swiss bobsledder
 Arne B. Mollén (1913–2000), Norwegian sports official
 Jean Mollen, Swiss bobsledder
 Jenny Mollen (b. 1979), American actress

See also 
 Mollen Commission
 Mollens (disambiguation)